Abfab Songs is an EP by American singer-songwriter Marcella Detroit, released in 1999 through her website. The six-song EP consists entirely of original songs featured on Absolutely Fabulous in 1996, when Detroit guest-starred in two episodes as an angel.

Critical reception 

Aaron Badgley from Allmusic gave the EP a positive review, calling it an "interesting release", and complementing the musical variety, but criticizing the packaging and short length.

Track listing

References 

1999 EPs
Marcella Detroit albums
Absolutely Fabulous